Sep Vanmarcke (born 27 July 1988) is a Belgian professional road racing cyclist, who currently rides for UCI WorldTeam . In August 2021 he was named to the start list for the Vuelta a España, his seventh Grand Tour.

Career
Vanmarcke was born in Kortrijk.

Garmin–Cervélo (2011–2012)
He took the biggest win of his career to date on the 2012 Omloop Het Nieuwsblad, attacking fiercely twice. The first attack came on the Molenberg climb, thinning the field, and he attacked again on the 'Lange Munte' cobbled section to reduce the lead group to only two competitors, Juan Antonio Flecha and Tom Boonen. He outsprinted them to claim the victory.

Blanco Pro Cycling (2013–2016)

2013

In 2013, Vanmarcke was focusing on the Classics, but he injured his knee in a crash at Tirreno–Adriatico, which hindered his form for the first important one-day races of the season. He nonetheless participated in the Tour of Flanders, finishing 3 minutes in arrears of Fabian Cancellara. A week later, he finished second to Cancellara in Paris–Roubaix. He escaped with Stijn Vandenbergh after cobbled sector 6 but was joined later on by Cancellara and Zdeněk Štybar. On the cobbled section Carrefour de l'Arbre, Štybar and Vandenbergh were dispatched one-by-one because they collided with spectators. Vanmarcke lost the 2-man sprint contested in the velodrome and was emotional afterward, since he had come so close to victory.

2014
In 2014, Vanmarcke showed excellent form in the classics, with fourth place in Omloop Het Nieuwsblad and third in Kuurne–Brussels–Kuurne the following day. He also recorded top five finishes in E3 Harelbeke (fifth) and Gent–Wevelgem (fourth). In the Tour of Flanders, Vanmarcke was the only rider able to follow Cancellara's attack on the final climb of the Paterberg. The pair caught up with the two earlier escapees, Vandenbergh and Greg Van Avermaet. The race came down to a sprint between the four, with Cancellara emerging victorious ahead of Van Avermaet and Vanmarcke.

2015–2016
Vanmarcke failed to score a top 10 finish at the monuments in the 2015 season but placed 5th at Omloop Het Nieuwsblad, 4th at Strade Bianche, 5th at E3 Harelbeke and 6th at Gent-Wevelgem.

He was also 8th at E3 Harelbeke and finished 2nd at Gent–Wevelgem. He achieved his best result of the season at the Ster ZLM Toer winning stage 4 and the overall.

Cannondale–Drapac (2017–2020)
For the 2017 season, Vanmarcke returned to his former team that he had raced for in the 2011 and 2012 season. He finished 3rd at Omloop Het Nieuwsblad, but crashed out at the Tour of Flanders which also prevented him from starting in Paris–Roubaix. However he returned to the peloton later on in the season and almost won the National Road Race Championships.

Vanmarcke's first podium of the 2018 season came at Omloop Het Nieuwsblad, where he finished 3rd. He then went on to finish 7th at E3 Harelbeke before claiming 3rd at Dwars door Vlaanderen. At the Tour of Flanders, Vanmarcke was once again struck with bad luck as he punctured several times at the start of the race. He only finished 13th but, a week later at Paris–Roubaix he finished 6th. He finished 5th at the National Road Race Championships before lining up for his 5th Tour de France in July.

Israel Start-Up Nation
In October 2020, Vanmarcke signed a three-year contract with the  team.

Major results

2006
 4th Road race, National Junior Road Championships
2007
 3rd Ronde Van Vlaanderen Beloften
 6th Circuit de Wallonie
2008
 2nd Kattekoers
 6th La Côte Picarde
 8th Ronde Van Vlaanderen Beloften
2009
 3rd Kattekoers
 3rd La Côte Picarde
 4th Overall Tour du Haut-Anjou
1st Stage 1
 5th Ronde Van Vlaanderen Beloften
 6th Kampioenschap van Vlaanderen
 8th Sparkassen Giro Bochum
2010
 1st  Mountains classification, Four Days of Dunkirk
 2nd Overall Circuit Franco-Belge
 2nd Gent–Wevelgem
 3rd Ronde van het Groene Hart
 8th Grand Prix de Wallonie
 9th Paris–Camembert
2011
 4th E3 Prijs Vlaanderen
2012
 1st Omloop Het Nieuwsblad
 3rd Rogaland GP
 5th E3 Harelbeke
 7th Dwars door Vlaanderen
2013
 1st Grand Prix Impanis-Van Petegem
 1st Grote Prijs Wase Polders
 2nd Paris–Roubaix
 2nd Grote Prijs Jef Scherens
 5th Road race, National Road Championships
 5th Overall Tour des Fjords
 5th Rund um Köln
2014
 1st Stage 3 Tour of Norway
 3rd Kuurne–Brussels–Kuurne
 3rd Tour of Flanders
 4th Omloop Het Nieuwsblad
 4th Gent–Wevelgem
 4th Paris–Roubaix
 5th E3 Harelbeke
 5th Binche–Chimay–Binche
 7th Grand Prix Cycliste de Québec
 9th Overall Tour of Alberta
1st Stage 3
2015
 4th Overall Tour du Poitou-Charentes
 4th Strade Bianche
 4th London–Surrey Classic
 5th Omloop Het Nieuwsblad
 5th E3 Harelbeke
 6th Gent–Wevelgem
 7th Münsterland Giro
2016
 1st  Overall Ster ZLM Toer
1st Stage 4
 2nd Gent–Wevelgem
 3rd Tour of Flanders
 4th Paris–Roubaix
 5th Time trial, National Road Championships
 8th E3 Harelbeke
 9th Overall Tour du Poitou Charentes
2017
 1st  Points classification, Tour of Austria
 2nd Road race, National Road Championships
 3rd Omloop Het Nieuwsblad
 4th Bretagne Classic Ouest–France
 4th London–Surrey Classic
 8th Grand Prix Cycliste de Québec
 10th Grand Prix Cycliste de Montréal
2018
 3rd Omloop Het Nieuwsblad
 3rd Dwars door Vlaanderen
 5th Road race, National Road Championships
 6th Paris–Roubaix
 7th E3 Harelbeke
 7th Paris–Tours
2019
 1st Bretagne Classic
 1st Stage 1 Tour du Haut Var
 4th Paris–Roubaix
 5th Overall Étoile de Bessèges
 6th Trofeo Matteotti
 9th Gran Premio Bruno Beghelli
2021
 2nd Overall Settimana Ciclistica Italiana 
 3rd Omloop Het Nieuwsblad
 4th Le Samyn
 5th Tour of Flanders
2022
 1st Maryland Cycling Classic
 8th Grote Prijs Marcel Kint
2023
 6th Nokere Koerse
 10th Omloop Het Nieuwsblad

Grand Tour general classification results timeline

Classics results timeline

References

External links

Sep Vanmarcke's profile on Cycling Base
 

1988 births
Living people
Sportspeople from Kortrijk
Cyclists from West Flanders
Belgian male cyclists